The Jewish–Roman wars were a series of large-scale revolts by the Jews of the Eastern Mediterranean against the Roman Empire between 66 and 135 CE. The First Jewish–Roman War (66–73 CE) and the Bar Kokhba revolt (132–136 CE) were nationalist rebellions, striving to restore an independent Judean state, while the Kitos War was more of an ethno-religious conflict, mostly fought outside Judea Province. Hence, some sources use the term Jewish-Roman Wars to refer only to the First Jewish–Roman War (66–73 CE) and the Bar Kokhba revolt (132–135 CE), while others include the Kitos War (115–117 CE) as one of the Jewish–Roman wars.

The Jewish–Roman wars had a dramatic impact on the Jewish people, turning them from a major population in the Eastern Mediterranean into a scattered and persecuted minority. The Jewish–Roman wars are often cited as a disaster to Jewish society. The events also had a major impact on Judaism, after the central worship site of Second Temple Judaism, the Second Temple in Jerusalem, was destroyed by Titus's troops in 70 CE.

Sequence 
The Jewish–Roman wars include the following:
 First Jewish–Roman War (66–73 CE) — also called the First Jewish Revolt or the Great Jewish Revolt, spanning from the 66 CE insurrection, through the 67 CE fall of the Galilee, the destruction of Jerusalem and the Second Temple and institution of the Fiscus Judaicus in 70 CE, and finally the fall of Masada in 73 CE.
 Kitos War (115–117 CE) — known as the "Rebellion of the Exile" and sometimes called the Second Jewish–Roman War.
 Bar Kokhba revolt (132–136 CE) — also called the Second Jewish–Roman War (when Kitos War is not counted), or the Third (when the Kitos War is counted).

History

Prelude

Following increasing Roman domination of the Eastern Mediterranean, the client kingdom of the Herodian dynasty had been officially merged into the Roman Empire in the year 6 CE with the creation of the Roman province of Judea. The transition of the Tetrarchy of Judea into a Roman province immediately brought a great deal of tensions and a Jewish uprising by Judas of Galilee erupted right away as a response to the Census of Quirinius.

Although initially pacified (the years between 7 and 26 CE being relatively quiet), the province continued to be a source of trouble under Emperor Caligula (after 37 CE). The cause of tensions in the east of the Empire was complicated, involving the spread of Greek culture, Roman law, and the rights of Jews in the Empire. Caligula did not trust the prefect of Roman Egypt, Aulus Avilius Flaccus. Flaccus had been loyal to Tiberius, had conspired against Caligula's mother and had connections with Egyptian separatists. In 38 CE, Caligula sent Herod Agrippa to Alexandria unannounced to check on Flaccus. According to Philo, the visit was met with jeers from the Greek population, who saw Agrippa as the king of the Jews. Flaccus tried to placate both the Greek population and Caligula by having statues of the emperor placed in Jewish synagogues. As a result, extensive religious riots broke out in the city. Caligula responded by removing Flaccus from his position and executing him. In 39 CE, Agrippa accused Herod Antipas, the tetrarch of Galilee and Perea, of planning a rebellion against Roman rule with the help of Parthia. Herod Antipas confessed and Caligula exiled him. Agrippa was rewarded with his territories.

Riots again erupted in Alexandria in 40 CE between Jews and Greeks. Jews were accused of not honoring the emperor. Disputes occurred also in the city of Jamnia. Jews were angered by the erection of a clay altar and destroyed it. In response, Caligula ordered the erection of a statue of himself in the Temple of Jerusalem, a demand in conflict with Jewish monotheism. In this context, Philo writes that Caligula "regarded the Jews with most especial suspicion, as if they were the only persons who cherished wishes opposed to his". The governor of Roman Syria, Publius Petronius, fearing civil war if the order were carried out, delayed implementing it for nearly a year. Agrippa finally convinced Caligula to reverse the order. However, only Caligula's death at the hands of Roman conspirators in 41 CE prevented a full-scale war in Judaea, that might well have spread to the entire Eastern Roman Empire.

Caligula's death did not stop the tensions completely and in 46 CE an insurrection led by two brothers, the Jacob and Simon uprising, broke out in the Judea province. The revolt, mainly in the Galilee, began as sporadic insurgency; when it climaxed in 48 CE it was quickly put down by Roman authorities. Both Simon and Jacob were executed.

First Jewish–Roman War

The First Jewish–Roman War began in the year 66 CE, originating in the Greek and Jewish religious tensions, and later escalated due to anti-taxation protests and attacks upon Roman citizens. In response to the Roman plunder of the Second Jewish Temple and the execution of up to 6,000 Jews in Jerusalem, a full-scale rebellion erupted. The Roman military garrison of Judaea was quickly overrun by rebels, while the pro-Roman king Herod Agrippa II and Roman officials fled Jerusalem. As it became clear the rebellion was getting out of control, Cestius Gallus, the legate of Syria, brought the Syrian army, based on XII Fulminata and reinforced by auxiliary troops, to restore order and quell the revolt. Despite initial advances, the Syrian Legion was ambushed and defeated by Jewish rebels at the Battle of Beth Horon with 6,000 Romans massacred and the Legio aquila lost – a result that shocked the Roman leadership.

The experienced and unassuming general Vespasian was then tasked with crushing the rebellion in Judaea province. His son Titus was appointed second-in-command. Vespasian was given four legions and assisted by forces of King Agrippa II. In 67 CE he invaded Galilee. While avoiding a direct attack on the reinforced city of Jerusalem which was packed with the main rebel force, Titus's forces launched a persistent campaign to eradicate rebel strongholds and punish the population. Within several months Vespasian and Titus took over the major Jewish strongholds of Galilee and finally overran Jotapata under command of Yosef ben Matitiyahu, following a 47-day siege. Meantime in Jerusalem, an attempt by Sicarii leader Menahem to take control of the city failed, resulting in his execution. A peasant leader Simon Bar-Giora was ousted from the city by the new moderate Judean government and Ananus ben Ananus began reinforcing the city.

Driven from Galilee, Zealot rebels and thousands of refugees arrived in Judea, creating political turmoil in Jerusalem. Zealots were at first sealed in the Temple compound. However, confrontation between the mainly Sadducee Jerusalemites and the mainly Zealot factions of the Northern Revolt under the command of John of Giscala and Eleazar ben Simon became evident. With Edomites entering the city and fighting on the side of the Zealots, Ananus ben Ananus was killed and his forces suffered severe casualties. Simon bar Giora, commanding 15,000 troops, was then invited into Jerusalem by the Sadducee leaders to stand against the Zealots, and quickly took control over much of the city. Bitter infighting between factions of Bar Giora, John and Elazar followed through the year 69 CE.

After a lull in the military operations, owing to civil war and political turmoil in Rome, Vespasian returned to Rome and was accepted as the new Emperor in 69 CE. With Vespasian's departure, Titus besieged the center of rebel resistance in Jerusalem in early 70 CE. While the first two walls of Jerusalem were breached within three weeks, a stubborn stand prevented the Roman Army from breaking the third and thickest wall. Following a brutal seven-month siege, in which Zealot infighting resulted in the burning of the entire food supply of the city to enhance "fighting to the end", the Romans finally succeeded in breaching the weakened Jewish forces in the summer of 70 CE. Following the fall of Jerusalem, Titus left for Rome, while Legion X Fretensis defeated the remaining Jewish strongholds later on, finalizing the Roman campaign in Masada in 73/74 CE.

Kitos War

The Kitos War (115–117 CE) also known as mered ha'galuyot or mered ha'tfutzot (Rebellion of the exile) is the name given to the second of the Jewish–Roman wars. The Kitos War consisted of major revolts by diasporic Jews in Cyrene (Cyrenaica), Cyprus, Mesopotamia and Aegyptus, which spiraled out of control, resulting in a widespread slaughter of Roman citizens and others (200,000 in Cyrene, 240,000 in Cyprus according to Cassius Dio) by the Jewish rebels. The rebellions were finally crushed by Roman legionary forces, chiefly by the Roman general Lusius Quietus, whose nomen later gave the conflict its title, as "Kitos" is a later corruption of Quietus.

Bar Kokhba Revolt

The Bar Kokhba revolt (132–136 CE) was the third major rebellion by the Jews of Judaea Province and the Eastern Mediterranean against the Roman Empire and the last of the Jewish–Roman wars. The establishment of the pagan city of Aelia Capitolina in Jerusalem by the emperor Hadrian is most likely what sparked the uprising. The Jews of Judea spent a long time preparing for this rebellion in secrecy, carving out hundreds of underground hideout systems beneath their settlements. Simon bar Kokhba was acclaimed as a Messiah, a heroic figure who could restore Israel. The revolt established an independent state of Israel over parts of Judea for more than two years, but a Roman army made up of six full legions with auxilia and elements from up to six additional legions finally crushed it.

The rebels' eventual failure was a catastrophe. Due to the brutal suppression of the revolt, which resulted in a huge number of people being killed or captured, Judea's rural countryside was devastated and depopulated. Judea was no longer the focus of Jewish life, and the province's name was changed to Syria-Palaestina. The Romans barred Jews from Jerusalem, except to attend Tisha B'Av. Although Jewish Christians hailed Jesus as the Messiah and did not support Bar Kokhba, they were barred from Jerusalem along with the rest of the Jews. The war and its aftermath helped differentiate Christianity as a religion distinct from Judaism (see Jewish Christian#Split of early Christianity and Judaism).

The rebellion is also known as The Third Jewish–Roman War or The Third Jewish Revolt, though some historians relate it as Second Jewish Revolt, not counting the Kitos War, 115–117 CE.

Aftermath

Due to the First Jewish-Roman War, the destruction of the Second Temple ushered in a major time of dramatic reformation in religious leadership, causing the face of Judaism to change. The Second Temple served as the centralized location from which the ruling groups Sadducees and the Pharisees maintained Judaism, with rivaling Essenes and Zealots being largely in opposition. With the destruction of the temple, the major ruling group lost their powerthe Sadducees, who were the priests, directly lost their localized power source and were rendered obsolete. Due to this, only one group was left with all the powerthe Pharisees, who were the rabbinic group. Rabbinic power did not derive from the temple or from military prowess, but spread to different communities through the synagogues. This changed the way Judaism was practiced on a daily basis, which included changing from sacrificing animals to praying in order to worship God. Rabbinic Judaism became a religion centered around synagogues, and the Jews themselves dispersed throughout the Roman world and beyond. With the destruction of Jerusalem, important centers of Jewish culture developed in the area of Galilee and in Babylonia and work on the Talmud continued in these locations. Before Vespasian's departure, the Pharisaic sage and Rabbi Yohanan ben Zakkai obtained his permission to establish a Judaic school at Yavne. Zakkai was smuggled away from Jerusalem in a coffin by his students. This school later became a major center of Talmudic study (see Mishnah).

Hadrian (emperor 117–138 CE) undertook punitive actions towards the Jewish community, including barring them from entering Jerusalem, except on the fast day of Tisha B'Av. Jerusalem itself was re-founded as the Roman polis of Aelia Capitolina, and the Province of Judaea was renamed Syria Palaestina. At the former Jewish sanctuary on the Temple Mount he installed two statues, one of Jupiter and another of himself.

The Jewish–Roman wars had a dramatic impact on the Jews, turning them from a major population in the Eastern Mediterranean into a scattered and persecuted minority. The Jewish–Roman wars are often cited as a disaster to Jewish society. The defeat of the Jewish revolts altered the Jewish population and enhanced the importance of Jewish diaspora, essentially moving the demographic center of Jews from Judea to Galilee and Babylon, with minor communities across the Mediterranean. Although having a sort of autonomy in the Galilee until the 4th century and later a limited success in establishing the short-lived Sasanian Jewish autonomy in Jerusalem in 614–617 CE, Jewish dominance in parts of the Southern Levant was regained only in the mid-20th century, with the founding of the modern state of Israel in 1948 CE.

See also
History of the Jews in the Roman Empire
Siege of Jerusalem (63 BC) by Pompey
Siege of Jerusalem (37 BC) by Herod, supported by Rome, against Hasmonean king Antigonus, supported by the Parthians
Jewish revolt against Constantius Gallus (351-352 CE), originating in Sepphoris in the Galilee
Samaritan revolts (484–572 CE) — Samaritan-incited revolts, originating largely in Neapolis, some with Jewish participation
Jewish revolt against Heraclius (614-617/625 CE) — the Jewish revolt during the Byzantine–Sasanian War of 602–628, originating in Tiberias in the Galilee

References

Further reading

Chancey, Mark A., and Adam Porter. 2001. "The Archaeology of Roman Palestine". Near Eastern Archaeology 64: 164–203.
Goodman, Martin. 1989. "Nerva, the Fiscus Judaicus and Jewish identity." Journal of Roman Studies 79: 26–39.
Katz, Steven T., ed. 2006. The Cambridge History of Judaism. Vol. 4, The Late Roman-Rabbinic Period. Cambridge, UK: Cambridge University Press.
Magness, Jodi. 2012. The Archaeology of the Holy Land: From the Destruction of Solomon's Temple to the Muslim Conquest. Cambridge, UK: Cambridge University Press.
Pucci Ben Zeev, Miriam. 2005. Diaspora Judaism in turmoil, 116/117 CE: Ancient sources and modern insights. Dudley, MA: Peeters.
Schäfer, P., ed. 2003. The Bar Kokhba War reconsidered: New perspectives on the Second Jewish Revolt against Rome. Tübingen, Germany: Mohr Siebeck.
Tsafrir, Yoram. 1988. Eretz Israel from the Destruction of the Second Temple until the Muslim Conquest. Vol. 2, Archaeology and Art. Jerusalem: Yad Ben Zvi.

 
60s conflicts
70s conflicts
Jews and Judaism in the Roman Empire
60s in the Roman Empire
70s in the Roman Empire
110s in the Roman Empire
130s in the Roman Empire
1st-century Judaism
2nd-century Judaism
110s conflicts
130s conflicts